The Orthodox Christian Reformed Churches (OCRC) were a theologically conservative federation of churches in the Dutch Calvinist tradition. Although the federation has disbanded, most of its churches still exist.  They are in the United States and Canada. They confess the Bible to be the Word of God and believe it is faithfully summarized by the Belgic Confession, Heidelberg Catechism, and Canons of Dort.

History 

The first Orthodox Christian Reformed Church was organized in Listowel, Ontario, in 1979 by families who had left the Christian Reformed Church for doctrinal reasons, especially its Report 44. Rev. Harry Van Dyken was very active in the formation of the federation and founding churches.  Congregations also formed in Allendale, Michigan (1979 or 1980); Burlington, Washington (1980); and Toronto, Ontario (1980).

Representatives of these churches began meeting in 1981 to discuss church order and federation. The Orthodox Christian Reformed Churches formally federated in March 1988 with seven congregations. In addition to the four mentioned above, there were congregations in Bowmanville, Ontario (1982); Cambridge, Ontario (1984); and Ripon, California (1985). At its peak about 1995 the federation numbered fifteen churches in two classes, Classis East and Classis West.  Almost all the new churches were in the West.

The OCRC federation had two decades of stability and then a decade of decline. In 2004 the Listowel congregation joined the Protestant Reformed Churches in America.

The August 2008 OCRC synod voted to accept the invitation of the United Reformed Churches in North America to join them.

Beliefs 
The Orthodox Christian Reformed Churches believed in the Bible as the inerrant Word of God and the only rule of faith and practice.

Confessions 

These are also called the Three Forms of Unity.

Belgic Confession of Faith, 1561
Heidelberg Catechism, 1563
Canons of Dort, 1618–1619

Creeds 

These are sometimes known as the Ecumenical Creeds.

Apostles' Creed, circa 150
Nicene Creed, 381
Athanasian Creed, 500

References

External links 
 OCRC Position Papers
 OCRC Church Order

Reformed denominations in the United States
Reformed denominations in Canada
Christian organizations established in 1979
Dutch Reformed Church
Calvinist denominations established in the 20th century
Organizations disestablished in 2008